Omotoso or Omotosho is a Nigerian surname.

 Akin Omotoso (born 1974), Nigerian film director, writer, and actor living in South Africa, son of Kole and brother of Ywande
 Kole Omotoso (born 1943), Nigerian writer living in South Africa
 Mike Omotosho, Nigerian politician, chairman of the Labour Party 2015–2016
 Omolara Omotosho (born 1993), Nigerian sprinter
 Rosaline Omotosho (died 1999), Nigerian judge
 Tim Omotoso (born 1958), Nigerian televangelist and senior pastor of the Jesus Dominion International
 Wale Omotoso (born 1985), Nigerian boxer
 Yewande Omotoso (born 1980), South African-based novelist, architect and designer living in South Africa, daughter of Kole and sister of Akin